is a city located in Saitama Prefecture, Japan. , the city had an estimated population of 149,826 in 69,859 households and a population density of 3100 persons per km².

Geography
Sayama is located in south-central Saitama Prefecture, on the alluvial lowland of the Iruma River, which flows through the city towards the northeast (toward Kawagoe) . The Japan Air Self-Defense Force's Iruma Air Base is located in the south of the city hall, 90% of which is in Sayama city area (and only 10% in Iruma city area).

Surrounding municipalities
Saitama Prefecture
 Kawagoe
 Hannō
 Tokorozawa
 Hidaka
 Iruma

Climate
Sayama has a humid subtropical climate (Köppen Cfa) characterized by warm summers and cool winters with light to no snowfall.  The average annual temperature in Sayama is 14.3 °C. The average annual rainfall is 1485 mm with September as the wettest month. The temperatures are highest on average in August, at around 26.1 °C, and lowest in January, at around 3.6 °C.

Demographics
Per Japanese census data, the population of Sayama increased nearly fivefold from 1960 to 1990. It peaked at just over 160,000 people around the year 2000 and has declined since.

History
During the Kamakura period, the area developed as a post station on the Kamakura Kaidō highway, as the dividing point on the routes to Kōzuke Province and Shimotsuke Province. 
The town of Irumagawa was established within Iruma District with the establishment of the modern municipalities system on April 1, 1889. On July 1, 1954, Irumagawa merged with the neighboring villages of Mizutomi, Kashiwahara, Okutomi, Hirokane, and Irima to create the city of Sayama.

The city was the location of the Sayama Incident, a 1963 murder and trial which resulted in the false accusation and conviction of an innocent man, a member of the Burakumin minority group, of murder.

Government
Sayama has a mayor-council form of government with a directly elected mayor and a unicameral city council of 22 members. Sayama contributes two members to the Saitama Prefectural Assembly. In terms of national politics, the city is part of Saitama 9th district of the lower house of the Diet of Japan.

Economy
Sayama is one of the major industrial centers of Saitama Prefecture, although it is also a bedroom community with over 15% of its population commuting to Tokyo for work. The city, along with neighboring Iruma, is a well known tea growing region, producing Sayama Tea.

Honda assembly plant
Sayama is the location of an automobile assembly plant, which opened in 1964, for Honda/Acura vehicles, currently including the Fit, Honda Odyssey (international), CR-V, RLX, and Clarity and in the past the Accord, Prelude, Vigor, Inspire, Legend and Integra. The plant was briefly closed, but not damaged, following the March 2011 Tōhoku earthquake and tsunami, and restarted production in April 2011, albeit at lower production levels. In 2017, Honda announced that the Sayama plant will close in March 2022, after production of the Odyssey and Clarity models end. Honda will consolidate production at its Yorii factory for future models.

Other businesses
The Lotte candy and food processing company operates a facility in Sayama.

Dai Nippon Printing Company, Ltd. imaging media division operates a large coating facility in the city.

Sankyo Flute Company is located in Sayama.

Sayama Haselfoods is the only baklava manufacturing facility in Japan. Located in Aoyagi, Sayama, Haselfoods also imports food products from the Mediterranean.

Education

University
Tokyo Kasei University – Sayama campus
Bunri University of Hospitality
Musashino Gakuin University

Primary and secondary education
 Sayama has 15 public elementary schools and eight public middle schools operated by the city government, and four public high schools operated by the Saitama Prefectural Board of Education. In addition, there are one private elementary school, one price junior high school and two private high schools. The prefecture also operates one special education school for the handicapped.

Transportation

Railway
 Seibu Railway - Seibu Shinjuku Line
  -   - 
Seibu Railway - Seibu Ikebukuro Line

Highway

Military facilities
Iruma Air Base

Sister cities
 Worthington, Ohio, United States since November 1, 1999
  Hangzhou, Zhejiang, China  (friendship city) since July 8, 1996
  Tongyeong, South Gyeongsang, South Korea, since July 4, 1973

Local attractions

 Irumagawa Tanabata Matsuri.
Sayama Ski Area, an Indoor ski slope  
Sayama Inariyama Park
Shimizu Hachiman-gu

Sports
The Secom Rugguts rugby union team, and the Saitama Soccer Club of the Kantō Soccer League, are located in Sayama.

In popular culture
Asteroid 4461 Sayama was named after the city.

Noted people from Sayama
Matsushige Ohno, politician
Shiori Kazama, director, The Mars Canon
Mitsuo Hashimoto, manga artist
Yohei Hayashi, footballer
Ryuji Hijikata, professional wrestler
Tetsurō Araki, anime director
Kensuke Kazama, photographer

References

External links

Official Website 

Cities in Saitama Prefecture
Sayama